Bollocks to Alton Towers: Uncommonly British Days Out is a humorous travel book written by Robin Halstead, Jason Hazeley, Alex Morris, and Joel Morris (the creators of The Framley Examiner), which showcases unusual attractions, left-field museums and one-off days out in the United Kingdom.

The introduction describes the book as "a collection of the underdogs of British tourism... [that] say more about Britain and the British than any number of corkscrew thrill rides or high-tech Interactive Visitor Experiences."

The book was published in hardback by Michael Joseph Ltd (an imprint of the Penguin Group) in 2005. It was also published in paperback by Penguin Books in 2006. The book received favourable reviews from The Times, The Press, and The Daily Telegraph. A sequel, titled Far From the Sodding Crowd, was published in hardback in 2007. A paperback edition, More Bollocks to Alton Towers, was published in April 2008.

A short documentary, Far From the Sodding Crowd, was made in 2009 and features some of the attractions included in both books, as well as writers Jason Hazeley and Joel Morris.

Contents

Attractions covered in the book:

Blackgang Chine 
British Lawnmower Museum 
Peasholm Park Naval Warfare 
Louis Tussaud's House of Wax - No longer open
Kelvedon Hatch Nuclear Bunker 
Porteath Bee Centre 
Mad Jack's Sugar Loaf 
Keith and Dufftown Railway 
The EastEnders Set
Pitt Rivers Museum 
Eden Ostrich World  - No longer open
Keith Harding's World of Mechanical Music  - No longer open
Shah Jahan Mosque 
The Beckham Trail 
Mother Shipton's Cave and Dripping Well 
Apollo Pavilion 
Hamilton Toy Collection 
Imber 
Cumberland Pencil Museum 
Pack o' Cards Inn 
Diggerland 
Orford Ness 
The Wellcome Collection of Medical History 
Cast Courts, Victoria and Albert Museum 
Tebay Services 
The Williamson Tunnels 
Barometer World 
Portmeirion 
Edinburgh Camera Obscura and World of Illusions 
The Dinosaur Park and Tidal Lake 
House of Marbles 
Dennis Severs' House 
Bletchley Park 
The Workhouse Museum 
Llanfairpwllgwyngyllgogerychwyrndrobwllllantysiliogogogoch 
South Bridge Vaults 
Gnome Magic 
A La Ronde 
Port Sunlight 
Morpeth Bagpipe Museum 
Bekonscot Model Village 
Avebury 
Christ's House

References

External links
Far From the Sodding Crowd (Film) - Film not currently available (as of 30 August 2015)
Far From the Sodding Crowd (Film) - on Vimeo

2005 non-fiction books
British travel books
Books about the United Kingdom
Museums in popular culture